Reparation is an album by musician Eddy Grant. The title of this album is a call for restitution for the transatlantic slave trade.

Track listing 
"Concern Number One" – 4:14
"Everything Irie" – 3:56
"Everybody Rappin'" – 3:33
"(Gotta Be) Positive" – 3:40
"The Struggle" – 4:10
"Reparation" – 4:26
"Ringbang Man" – 4:03
"Tit for Tat" – 4:45
"Long Night" – 4:35
"Going Back Deh" – 4:33
"Love Weself" – 4:25
"Free My Soul" – 4:05
"Jesus Got a Face" – 5:10

References

2006 albums
Eddy Grant albums